Better Late Than Never may refer to:

 Procrastination

Books
Better Late Than Never: From Barrow Boy to Ballroom, by Len Goodman

Film and television 
 Better Late Than Never (1922 film) starring Sid Smith
 Better Late Than Never (1979 film), an American TV film
 Better Late Than Never (1983 film), a film directed by Bryan Forbes
 Better Late Than Never (TV series), 2015
 "Better Late Than Never", a Thomas & Friends Season 2 episode, based on the story of the same name from "More About Thomas the Tank Engine".

Music

Albums
 Better Late Than Never (Cold River Lady album), 1992
 Better Late Than Never (The Slackers album), 1996
 Better Late Than Never (Eddie and the Hot Rods album), 2004
 Better Late Than Never (Trife Diesel album), 2009
 Better Late Than Never (AndersonPonty Band album), 2015
 Better Late Than Never, debut album of Rosie 1976
 Better Late Than Never, a 1995 album by Craig Goldy

Songs
 "Better Late Than Never", single by The Nolans from Making Waves
 "Better Late Than Never", single by FM
 "Better Late Than Never", single by Tanya Tucker from Tanya Tucker singles discography
 "Better Late Than Never", single by Bobby Breen from Motown discography